John Loughlin (born 1948) is a British-based academic and educator from Northern Ireland, and a noted specialist in European territorial politics. After being educated in St. Malachy's College, he spent several years as a Cistercian monk at Our Lady of Bethlehem Abbey, Portglenone, Northern Ireland, where he carried out the usual studies for the priesthood in philosophy, theology and biblical studies. He is currently a Fellow at Blackfriars, Oxford. He is an Emeritus Fellow and former Tutor at St Edmund's College, where he was Director of the Von Hügel Institute, and a Senior Fellow and Affiliated Lecturer in the Department of Politics and International Studies, both at the University of Cambridge.

He was previously professor of politics at Cardiff University, where he remains an emeritus professor. He received his doctorate (Doctor of Political and Social Sciences) in 1987 at the European University Institute in Florence, Italy for a thesis, Regionalism and ethnic nationalism in France: a case study of Corsica.

Visiting professorships and senior fellowships

 Visiting Professor, St Mary's University Twickenham (2017–present)
 Adjunct Professor in Peace and Conflict Studies at Umeå University, Sweden (2010–2013)
 Maître de conférences, Université libre de Bruxelles (2009–2013)
 Professeur invité, Institut d'Etudes Politiques, Aix-en-Provence (2004–2010)
 Visiting Research Fellow, Merton College Oxford University, 2004 (currently member of the Senior Common Room)
 European Studies Centre Visiting Research Fellow at St Antony's College Oxford University, 2005–06 (currently member of the Senior Common Room)
 Distinguished Visiting Research Fellow at the Graduate School of Humanities and Social Sciences in Queen Mary, University of London, 2009
 Visiting Scholar of the Residential Colloquium at the Center of Theological Inquiry (founded by Princeton Theological Seminary but now an independent research institute), 2010

Memberships
 Oblate of the Order of St Benedict (OSB Obl.) of Prinknash Abbey, Gloucesteshire, United Kingdom
 Catholic Writers Guild, United Kingdom 2012

Awards
 Honorary Doctorate, University of Umeå, Sweden (October 2009) "in recognition of his contribution to research in the field of European politics and territorial governance".
 Officier, Ordre des Palmes Académiques, France (2010) "in recognition of his research on European politics and his contribution to French language and culture".
 Honorary Professor, Cardiff University (2010–2015)
 Chaire Ganshof van der Meersch, Université libre de Bruxelles (2013–14)
 Entry   into Who's Who UK - 2013
 Fellow, Royal Historical Society - 2009
 Fellow, Royal Society of Arts - 2009–2016
 Fellow, Academy of Social Sciences - 2010
 Fellow, European Academy of Sciences and Arts - 2013
 Fellow, Learned Society of Wales - 2014

Publications
He is the author of the authoritative Oxford Handbook of Local and Regional Democracy in Europe, and numerous other books and conference proceedings, published in several languages.

Books
 (Edited with Mark Callanan) 'A Research Agenda for Regional and Local Government'Edward Elgar, 2021 
(Edited with Sandrina Antunes) 'Europeanization and Territorial Politics in Small European Unitary States: A Comparative Analysis' Routledge, 2020 
(editor) ‘Human Dignity in the Judaeo-Christian Tradition: Catholic, Orthodox, Anglican and Orthodox Perspectives’ Bloomsbury Press, 2019 
 (edited with John Kincaid and Wilfried Swenden)'Routledge Handbook of Regionalism & Federalism', London: Routledge, 2013 
 (edited with Frank Hendriks and Anders Lidstrom), The Oxford Handbook of Local and Regional Democracy in Europe Oxford University Press, 2010; paperback 2011, 
Subnational Government: the French Experience (Macmillan Palgrave, 2007) In 263 libraries according to 
 (with Mirela Bogdani) Albania and the European Union: The Tumultuous Journey to Integration and Accession, (London: IB Tauris, 2007)
 Subnational Democracy in the European Union: Challenges and Opportunities (Oxford University Press, hardcover 2001; paperback 2004)
 (with M. Keating and K. Deschouwer), Culture, Institutions and Regional Development: a Study of Eight European Regions, (Cheltenham: Edward Elgar, 2003)
 (edited with Kris Deschouwer), The Transformation of Territorial Governance in the 21st Century, (Brussels: Flemish Academy of Belgium for Arts and Sciences, 2007)
 (edited with David Hanley), Spanish Political Parties, (Cardiff: Wales University Press, 2006)
 (edited with Alain Delcamp), La décentralisation dans les Etats de l'Union européenne, Coll. Les Etudes,  (Paris: La Documentation Française, 2003, 2ième édition)
 (edited with Claude Olivesi and F. Daftary), Autonomies Insulaires: vers une politique de différence pour la Corse (Ajaccio: Albiana, 1999)
Regional and local democracy in the European Union	Luxembourg: Office for Official Publications of the European Communities, 1999
also published in German as Die regionale und lokale Demokratie in der Europäischen Union 1999
Also published in Danish as: Det regionale og lokale demokrati i Den Europæiske Union. Luxembourg: Kontoret for De Europæiske Fællesskabers Officielle Publikationer, 1999
also published in Dutch as Regionale en lokale democratie in de Europese Unie 1999
also published in French as Démocratie locale et régionale dans l'Union européenne 1999
also published in Portuguese as A democracia regional e local na União Européia 1999
also published in Italian as La democrazia regionale e locale nell'Unione europea. 1999
 (edited with Michael Keating), The Political Economy of Regionalism (London: Routledge, 1997)
 (edited with Sonia Mazey), The End of the French Unitary State? Ten Years of Regionalization in France (London: Frank Cass Ltd., 1995)
 (edited with Arenilla Saez and T. Toonen) Europa de las Regiones: una Perspectiva Intergubernatal (Granada: University of Granada, 1994)
 (edited) Southern Europe Studies Guide (Bowker Saur Ltd, London, UK, 1993)
Review, by Richard Gillespie West European politics. 18, no. 2, (1995): 457
 (edited with M. Connolly) Public Policy in Northern Ireland: Adoption or adaptation? (Belfast: Policy Research Institute, 1990)

Periodical special issues
 (Guest editor with David Hanley), Religion et Politique, (Revue de Science Politique de l’Europe Méridionale. No. 17; Nov. 2002)

Peer-reviewed periodical articles (selected)
 "'Europe of the Regions' and the Federalization of Europe". 1996 Publius, pp 141–162
 (with Anders Lidstrom, and Chris Hudson.  2005. "The Politics of Local Income Tax in Sweden: Reform and Continuity". Local Government Studies. 31, no. 3: 351
 "Reconfiguring the State: Trends in Territorial Governance in European States" (2007) Regional &; Federal Studies. 17, no. 4: 385–403

References

External links
Profile of Professor John Loughlin, polis.cam.ac.uk; accessed 1 March 2014.
Cardiff University webpage

1940s births
Living people
Date of birth missing (living people)
Academics of Cardiff University
Academics of Queen Mary University of London
Academics of the University of Cambridge
Academics from Northern Ireland
Male non-fiction writers from Northern Ireland
Educators from Northern Ireland
Laicized Roman Catholic priests
Benedictines
Scientists from Belfast
Roman Catholics from Northern Ireland
Officiers of the Ordre des Palmes Académiques
21st-century writers from Northern Ireland
21st-century educators from Northern Ireland
21st-century non-fiction writers from Northern Ireland